Kamyshly (Qamışlı) is a rural locality (a village) in Udryakbashevsky Selsoviet, Blagovarsky District, Bashkortostan, Russia. The population was 3 as of 2010. There is 1 street.

Geography 
Kamyshly is located 17 km southwest of Yazykovo (the district's administrative centre) by road. Blagovar is the nearest rural locality.

References 

Rural localities in Blagovarsky District